The ITF World Tennis Tour Gran Canaria and the ITF World Tennis Tour Maspalomas are two back-to-back tournaments for professional female tennis players played on outdoor clay courts. The events are both classified as $60,000 ITF Women's World Tennis Tour tournaments and have been held in San Bartolomé de Tirajana, Spain, since 2021.

Past finals

Singles

Doubles

External links 
 ITF search 
 Official website

ITF Women's World Tennis Tour
Clay court tennis tournaments
Tennis tournaments in Spain
2021 establishments in Spain